A Jester's Tale is a 1964 Czech film directed by Karel Zeman. Described by Zeman as a "pseudo-historical" film, it is an anti-war black comedy set during the Thirty Years' War. The film combines live action with animation to suggest the artistic style of the engraver Matthäus Merian.

Cast
 Petr Kostka as Petr
 Miloslav Holub as Recruiting officer Matyáš of Babice
 Emília Vášáryová as Lenka
 Valentina Thielová as Countess Veronika
 Karel Effa as Hetman Varga of Koňousov
 Eva Šenková as Countess
 Eduard Kohout as Count
 Vladimír Menšík as Court painter
 Čestmír Řanda as Watchman
 Jiří Holý as Spanish officer
 Josef Haukvic as Musketeer
 František Kovářík as Jester

Reception
The film was a notable success at the 1964 San Francisco International Film Festival, winning Best Picture and Best Director. It was also voted Best Film at the 1964 Addis Ababa IFF in Ethiopia, and was honored in three categories at Cannes.

References

External links
 

1964 films
1960s black comedy films
Czechoslovak black-and-white films
1960s Czech-language films
Films directed by Karel Zeman
Czechoslovak animated films
Czech animated films
1964 animated films
Films with live action and animation
Czech historical adventure films
1960s historical adventure films
Films with screenplays by Pavel Juráček
Films set in the 1620s
Films set in the 1630s
Thirty Years' War in popular culture
Films with screenplays by Karel Zeman
1964 comedy films
1964 drama films
Czech black comedy films
1960s Czech films
Czech animated adventure films
Czech animated comedy films
Czech animated fantasy films